This article contains information about the literary events and publications of 1699.

Events
January 27 – Jonathan Swift is out of work after his employer, Sir William Temple, dies, leaving Swift £100.
May 4 – The beginning of the fictional Gulliver's Travels (1726).
June 1 – Joseph Addison receives a grant or pension from the Crown, enabling him to travel abroad.

New books

Prose
Richard Bentley – A Dissertation upon the Epistles of Phalaris (prev. pub. in William Wotton's Reflections upon Ancient and Modern Learning)
Samuel Clarke
Some Reflections on that part of a book called Amyntor, or a Defence of Milton's Life, which relates to the Writings of the Primitive Fathers, and the Canon of the New Testament
Three Practical Essays on Baptism, Confirmation and Repentance
Jeremy Collier – A Defence of the Short View of the Profaneness and Immorality of the English Stage (see 1698 in literature)
Anne Dacier (Anne Lefèvre) – Homer's Iliad (prose, first translation into French)
William Dampier – Voyages and Descriptions (vol. ii)
John Dunton – The Dublin Scuffle
George Farquhar – The Adventures of Covent-Garden
François Fénelon (anonymously) – Les Aventures de Télémaque ("The Adventures of Telemachus")
Samuel Garth – The Dispensary (satire by one of Pope's mentors)
John Hughes – The Court of Neptune
George Keith – The Deism of William Penn, and his Brethren
William King
Dialogues of the Dead (in support of Charles Boyle)
The Furmetary
A Journey to London
Gerard Langbaine – The Lives and Characters of the English Dramatick Poets (cont. by Charles Gildon)
Roger L'Estrange – Fables and Storyes Moralized
John Locke – Mr Locke's Reply to the Right Revered the Lord Bishop of Worcester's Answer to his Second Letter (see 1697 in literature)
Cornelius Nary – The Chief Points in Controversy between the Catholics and the Protestants
Frances Norton – Reliquae Gethinianae
John Oldmixon – Reflections on the Stage, and Mr Collier's Defence of the Short View
Nicolas Steno (Niels Stenson) – De solido intra solidum naturaliter contento dissertationis prodromus (Preliminary Discourse to a Dissertation on a Solid Body Naturally Contained within a Solid)
William Temple – Letters Written by Sir William Temple During his Being Ambassador at The Hague (edited initially by Jonathan Swift)
John Toland
The Life of John Milton
Amyntor; or, A Defence of Milton's Life
Thomas Traherne – A Serious and Pathetical Contemplation of the Mercies of God
William Wake – The Principles of the Christian Religion Explained
Ned Ward – A Trip to New-England
James Wright – Historia Histrionica

Poetry
Thomas Brown – A Collection of Miscellany Poems, Letters, etc.
Thomas D'Urfey – A Choice Collection of New Songs and Ballads
John Pomfret – The Choice
Nahum Tate – Elegies

Drama
Abel Boyer – Achilles, or Iphegenia in Aulis
Colley Cibber – Xerxes
John Dennis – Rinaldo and Armida
George Farquhar – The Constant Couple
Charles Gildon – Measure for Measure, or Beauty the Best Advocate (a re-adaptation of Davenant's 1662 adaptation The Law Against Lovers)
Joseph Harris – Love's a Lottery, and a Woman the Prize
Charles Hopkins – Friendship Improved
Peter Anthony Motteux – The Island Princess; or, The Generous Portuguese (opera, adapted from John Fletcher)
Mary Pix – The False Friend

Births
April 17 – Robert Blair, Scottish poet (died 1746)
April 28 – Joseph Spence, English literary historian (died 1768)
June 26 – Madame Geoffrin, French salonnière (died 1777)
August 13 (bapt.) – John Dyer, Welsh poet (died 1757)
December 29 – Friedrich Ludwig Abresch, German-born Dutch philologist (died 1782)

Deaths
January 21 – Obadiah Walker, English religious writer and controversialist (born 1616)
January 27 – Sir William Temple, English statesman and essayist (born 1628)
March 24 – John Evelyn the Younger, English translator (born 1655)
March 27 – Edward Stillingfleet, English theologian (born 1635)
April 21 – Jean Racine, French dramatist (born 1639)
April 22
Hans Erasmus Aßmann, Freiherr von Abschatz, German statesman and poet (born 1646)
Lady Anne Halkett, English memoirist (born 1623)
November 23 – Joseph Beaumont, English clergyman, academic and poet (born 1616)
December 16 – Erhard Weigel, German philosopher and mathematician (born 1625)

References

 
Years of the 17th century in literature